Flemington Bridge railway station is located on the Upfield line in Victoria, Australia. It serves the inner-northern Melbourne suburbs of Flemington and North Melbourne, and it opened on 10 April 1885 as Flemington. It was renamed Flemington Bridge on 3 December of that year.

The station is located on an embankment between the Mount Alexander Road and Racecourse Road rail overpasses. The CityLink tollway overpass is located a short distance west of the station.

History

Opening on 10 April 1885, seven months after the railway line from North Melbourne was extended to Coburg, Flemington Bridge was named after the bridge on Flemington Road that passes over the Moonee Ponds Creek. Originally built in 1851, to improve the connection for gold prospectors travelling to the Bendigo goldfields, the bridge was named Mains Bridge, after James Patrick Mains, a well-known contractor. It was later renamed Flemington Road Bridge, before settling on Flemington Bridge.

In 1886, permanent station buildings were erected at the station, with timber stairs leading to Boundary and Mount Alexander Roads.

In 1891, the Parliamentary Standing Committee on Railways recommended the construction of a spur line from Flemington Bridge to Pascoe Vale, to relieve crowding on the Essendon line at peak times, as well as providing a shorter alternative route to the city, following the route of what is now CityLink. The committee estimated the single track line would cost £93,000 to build, but recommended that only £30,000 be spent, with the remainder to be made up by donated land. However, the proposal was not taken up by government.

In 1944, the current station buildings, with asbestos cement roofs, was provided and, at the same time, the stairs were replaced by asphalted ramps.

During the construction of CityLink in 1997, a temporary crossover was provided near the Mount Alexander Road bridge, to allow Upfield line trains to terminate, with passengers shuttled by bus to Newmarket to continue their journey. This was to allow construction of the elevated road between Flemington Bridge and North Melbourne.

Platforms and services

Flemington Bridge has two side platforms. It is serviced by Metro Trains' Upfield line services.

Platform 1:
  all stations services to Flinders Street

Platform 2:
  all stations services to Upfield

Transport links

Ventura Bus Lines operates one route via Flemington Bridge station, under contract to Public Transport Victoria:
  : Melbourne CBD (Queen Street) – Broadmeadows station (Saturday and Sunday mornings only)

Yarra Trams operates two routes via Flemington Bridge station:
 : West Maribyrnong – Flinders Street station (Elizabeth Street CBD)
 : Westfield Airport West – Flinders Street station (Elizabeth Street CBD)

Gallery

References

External links

 Melway map at street-directory.com.au

Railway stations in Australia opened in 1885
Railway stations in Melbourne
Railway stations in the City of Moonee Valley
Railway stations in the City of Melbourne (LGA)